Armand Eli Lemieux (July 7, 1926 – December 30, 2015) was a Canadian professional hockey player who played for the Providence Reds, Pittsburgh Hornets, Springfield Indians and Syracuse Warriors in the American Hockey League.

References

External links
 

1926 births
2015 deaths
Canadian ice hockey left wingers
Ice hockey people from Ontario
Pittsburgh Hornets players
Providence Reds players
Sportspeople from Greater Sudbury
Springfield Indians players